Jeppe Gertsen (born February 9, 1997) is a Danish professional footballer who plays as a defender for Danish 1st Division club FC Fredericia.

Club career

Youth years
Born in Aarhus, Gertsen started out in the youth team of AGF before joining Silkeborg IF in 2009, initially with the under-13 team. He gradually ascended up the ranks during his teenage years, while simultaneously studying at Silkeborg Gymnasium, which he completed in 2017. In the summer of 2015, while a part of the under-19 squad, his contract was extended for three more years. It also was around this time that he started training with the first team on occasion. He appeared on the substitution bench for the senior squad a total of eight times during the 2015–16 and 2016–17 seasons.

Professional career
Gertsen made his first-team debut on 19 September 2017, playing the full 90 minutes of a second-round Danish Cup match against Kjellerup.

He made his Superliga debut on 10 December 2017, replacing Davit Skhirtladze in the final minutes of a 2–1 victory over Odense. The next month, Silkeborg signed him to a three-year contract extension, securing him until the summer of 2021.

On 28 January 2021, Gertsen signed a pre-contract with FC Fredericia, valid from 1 July 2021, where his contract with Silkeborg also expired.

References

External links
 Superliga profile
 Silkeborg profile 
 

Living people
1997 births
Danish men's footballers
Association football defenders
Aarhus Gymnastikforening players
Silkeborg IF players
Danish Superliga players
Danish 1st Division players
Footballers from Aarhus